Charles Donohoe (born 1905-date of death unknown) was an Australian professional tennis player. He won the 1931 Australian Open Tennis in men's doubles (with Roy Dunlop).

Grand Slam finals

Doubles (1 title)

References 

Australian male tennis players
Grand Slam (tennis) champions in men's doubles
1905 births
20th-century deaths

Place of birth missing
Australian Championships (tennis) champions
20th-century Australian people
Year of death missing